The Anglican Church of Mexico, originally known as Church of Jesus  is the Anglican province in Mexico and includes five dioceses. The primate is Enrique Treviño Cruz, Bishop of Cuernavaca, while Julio César Martín-Trejo, Ricardo Joel Gomez Osnaya, Francisco M. Moreno, and Alba S. Hernández, are the other bishops of the Church.  Although born in Mexico and not being the result of any foreign missionary effort, the shield of the denomination uses the colors representing Mexico as well as those of the United States-based Episcopal Church recognizing its historical connection with the US church since obtaining the apostolic succession from that church.

History

The Anglican Church of Mexico can trace its roots to the Mexican War for independence in 1810, and to the attempt in 1854 by several liberal minded priests who later supported the liberal Constitution of 1857 (for this reason they became known as “Constitutionalist Fathers”) to reform the local Roman Catholic Church, but it was the Reform War that led to the foundation of the Church. Religious reforms in 1857 secured freedom of religion, separating the Roman Catholic Church from government and politics. In 1860, the newly formed Church of Jesus contacted the Protestant Episcopal Church in the United States of America, seeking Apostolic Succession. In 1879, the first bishop, H. Chauncey Riley, was consecrated. In 1958, the fourth missionary bishop of Mexico José G. Saucedo was the first of the church's bishops to be consecrated on Mexican soil, being the de facto leader of the Mexican church for the second half of the 20th century leading the process for it to become an autonomous province of the Anglican Communion on 1 January 1995, and being elected its first primate archbishop.

Membership
Today, there are 52 Anglican parishes in Mexico, 36 missions, and 12 other affiliated institutions. While some sources claim 100,000 baptized members, the Church of England Yearbook, which includes information on other Anglican provinces, and a study published in 2016 by the Journal of Anglican Studies and Cambridge University Press, report that the church has 21,000 active baptized members.

Structure

The polity of the Anglican Church of Mexico is episcopal, as is true of all other Anglican churches. The church maintains a system of geographical parishes organized into dioceses. There are 5 of these, each headed by a bishop. Each diocese is divided into archdeaconries, each headed by a senior priest. The archdeaconries are further subdivided into parishes, headed by a parish priest. Several of the dioceses are named in Spanish merely for a compass direction — del Occindente, del Norte, del Sureste — which translate directly as "of the West" &c. However, the Episcopal Church and other English-language Anglican Communion sources instead render these names with "Mexico" — e.g. "of Western Mexico" — so these are the forms used on the English-language Wikipedia.

Diocese of Mexico
In 1879, diocesan bishop Henry C. Riley was ordained and consecrated by the Episcopal Church in the United States of America as "Bishop of the Valley of Mexico", to exercise oversight over the Mexican "Church of Jesus". Riley resigned in 1884 and the care of the independent church lapsed to the Presiding Bishop of the Episcopal Church. Henry Forrester, the church's local administrator, was elected Bishop of the Valley of Mexico, but died before consecration.

In 1904, the Episcopal Church formed all of the Mexican Republic into one Missionary District of Mexico, for North American Anglicans/Episcopalians in Mexico; and which the native Church of Jesus joined in 1906. That year, Henry D. Aves was consecrated first Missionary Bishop of Mexico and resigned in 1923. In 1926, Frank W. Creighton succeeded him as second missionary bishop. In 1972, the Episcopal Church divided the missionary district in three, creating those of Northern and of Western Mexico, and renaming the remaining portion as Central & Southern Mexico; on 1 January 1980, all three were erected into dioceses. In 1988/9 the Central and Southern diocese was again split in three, creating the Cuernavaca and Southeastern dioceses, the remainder being named, again, the Diocese of Mexico (City). The diocese today is based in Mexico City, where its cathedral is St Joseph of Grace.
Missionary bishops of the Missionary Diocese of Mexico
1879–1884: I diocesan bishop Henry C. Riley, Bishop of the Valley of Mexico
the Presiding Bishop, Provisional Bishop
Henry Forrester, bishop-elect
1904–1923: II diocesan bishop Henry D. Aves (first missionary bishop)
1926–1933: III diocesan bishop Frank W. Creighton, Bishop of Michigan
29 September 19311934: suffragan bishop Efrain Salinas y Velasco, suffragan bishop
1934–1957: IV diocesan bishop Efrain Salinas
1958–1972: V diocesan bishop José G. Saucedo (fourth missionary bishop; continued as Diocesan Bishop of the new Diocese of Central & Southern Mexico)
1964–1972: suffragan bishop Leonardo Romero, suffragan bishop (became I diocesan bishop of the new Diocese of Northern Mexico)
1964–1972: suffragan bishop Melchor Saucedo, suffragan bishop (became I diocesan bishop the new Diocese of Western Mexico)
1972–1980: V diocesan bishop José G. Saucedo (last missionary bishop continued as diocesan bishop of the now renamed Diocese of Central & Southern Mexico )
Bishops of the Diocese of Central & Southern Mexico (former Missionary Diocese of Mexico)
1973–1989:  V diocesan bishop José G. Saucedo (became first Diocesan Bishop of the new Diocese of Cuernavaca)
22 March 19801982 (resigned): suffragan bishop Roberto Martinez-Resendiz suffragan (in Nopala, Hidalgo)
22 March 19801989: suffragan bishop Claro Huerta Ramos, suffragan (in Arroyo Zacate, Veracruz; became I Diocesan Bishop of the new Diocese of Southeastern Mexico)
19851997: suffragan bishop Martiniano García Montiel, suffragan
Bishops of the Diocese of Mexico (former Diocese of Central & Southern Mexico)
19892003: VI diocesan bishop Sergio Carranza Gomez (Resigned to become auxiliary bishop of L.A., Cal., USA)
19902018 (died): Auxiliary Bishop Roberto Martinez-Resendiz
20022020: VII diocesan bishop Carlos Touché Porter (Due to retire at the latest on April 6, 2020, his jurisdiction was terminated by action of the Primate on August 6, 2020).
2022present: VIII diocesan bishop Alba S. Hernández G.

Diocese of Northern Mexico
Carved out in 1972 from the missionary district of Mexico; erected a diocese in 1980. Based in Monterrey, Nuevo León; where is the Cathedral of the Holy Family.
Bishops of Northern Mexico
19721986 (d.): I diocesan bishop Leonardo Romero (also Bishop-in-Charge of Episcopal Diocese of El Salvador from 1984)
19872002 (deposed for embezzlement and fraud): II diocesan bishop German Martínez Márquez
20032010: III diocesan bishop Marcelino Rivera Delgado
2010November 2020: IV diocesan bishop Francisco Moreno returned as acting bishop May 2022

Diocese of Western Mexico

Carved out in 1972 from the missionary district of Mexico; erected a diocese in 1980. Based in Zapopan, Jalisco; cathedral of St Paul in that city.
Bishops of Western Mexico
19721981: I diocesan bishop Melchor Saucedo Mendoza
19812002 (deposed for embezzlement and fraud): II diocesan bishop Samuel Espinoza V. 
20032018: III diocesan bishop Lino Rodríguez Amaro
20182030: IV diocesan bishop Ricardo Gómez Osnaya

Diocese of Cuernavaca
Carved out in 1989 from the Central & Southern diocese in 1988/9; Cathedral of St Michael & All Saints, Cuernavaca, Morelos.
Bishops of Cuernavaca
19891997: I Diocesan Bishop José G. Saucedo
19972002: II Diocesan Bishop Martiniano García Montiel
20032010 (resigned): III Diocesan Bishop Ramiro Mario Delgado Vera
20102013: James Ottley (Interim)
20132029: Enrique Treviño Cruz (consecrated 23 February 2013)

Diocese of Southeastern Mexico
Carved out in 1989 from the Central & Southern diocese in 1988/9; based in Xalapa, Veracruz.
Bishops of Southeastern Mexico
19891999: I Diocesan Bishop Claro Huerta Ramos (Retires and later deposed on corruption charges).
19992020 (March 10): II Diocesan Bishop Benito Juárez Martinez
 (Due to retire the latest on June 1, 2019, his jurisdiction was terminated by action of the Primate on March 10, 2020).

2019 (September 21) 2020 (March 10): Coadjutor Bishop Julio César Martín-Trejo
2020 (March 10) 2034 (October): III Diocesan Bishop Julio César Martín-Trejo

Primates
, a primate is elected to a six-year term which is renewable.

Primates of the Anglican Church of Mexico
19951997: José G. Saucedo (Cuernavaca)
1997:            Claro Huerta (Southeastern; Acting Primate)
19992002: (deposed for embezzlement and fraud ): Samuel Espinoza (Western)
20022004: Martiniano Garcia Montiel (Cuernavaca; Acting Primate)
20042014: Carlos Touché Porter (Mexico)
2014August 2020 (retirement) Francisco Moreno (Northern)
August 2020November 2020 Francisco Moreno (Northern; Acting Primate)
November 2020June 2022 Enrique Treviño Cruz (Cuernavaca; bishop functioning as primate)
11 June 2022present: Enrique Treviño Cruz (Cuernavaca)

Worship and liturgy
The Anglican Church of Mexico, being since its inception a Mexican catholic expression of Christianity, embraces three orders of ministry: deacon, priest, and bishop. A local variant of the Book of Common Prayer is used.

Ordination of women
The Anglican Church of Mexico allows women to be ordained, and women have been ordained as deacons and priests. The church allows the ordination of women to the episcopate. The first women were ordained to the priesthood in 1994 and, as of 2014, there were 17 women serving as priests in the Anglican Church of Mexico. As of 2021, 7 of the women priests served in the Diocese of Mexico. In 2020, the Anglican church in the Yucatán welcomed the first woman to be ordained to the diaconate for the region. In 2021, the Diocese of Mexico acknowledged that a woman may be elected bishop in the diocese. In November 2021, the Diocese of Mexico elected Alba Sally Sue Hernández as Bishop, making her the first woman to be elected bishop within the Anglican Church of Mexico. She was consecrated and ordained a bishop on January 29, 2022.

Human sexuality

In 2010, promoted by its primate, the general synod of the Anglican Church of Mexico prohibited same sex blessings and same sex ecclesiastical marriage.

The Anglican Church of Mexico only recognizes heterosexual marriage as the standard for marriage in the church. Upon the approval of gay civil marriage in Mexico, then Primate Francisco Moreno expressed that the official stance of the Anglican Church of Mexico will continue in spite of secular legislation.

One of the currently active bishops has openly spoken in support of same-gender marriage, Canadian-educated Julio César Martín-Trejo, bishop of the Diocese of the Southeast. At least one parish in the country has publicly expressed support for LGBTQ unions. Although unofficially, in the diocese of Mexico, bishops have allowed clergy to be in informal same-sex relationships, while in the Diocese of Western Mexico a retired gay priest officially in a secular civil marriage has been allowed to teach at its seminary. In 2019, Bishop Ricardo Joel Gomez Osnaya licensed an openly gay and married priest for a congregation in the Diocese of Western Mexico.

In 2016, the General Synod of the church published a pronouncement declaring itself to be against all forms of violence and discrimination against migrants, victims of violence, or the LGBTI community. On December 19, 2020, three diocesan Bishops released a statement explaining that they are discussing issues related to the LGBT community and church teaching, and are working towards a common understanding.

In 2021, for the first time in the history of IAM, one of its dioceses participated in an LGBT Pride Parade: on June 19, 2021, under the leadership of its bishop, the Right Rev. Julio César Martín-Trejo, the Anglican Diocese of the Southeast joined demands for equal civil marriage and LGBT rights in the city of Xalapa, Veracruz. Bishop Martín expressly asked the secular authorities to respect the Federal Supreme Court's decision and legalise gay civil marriage. His diocese also spoke out against hate crimes against LGBT people and others. Bishop Martín has also proposed a draft version for the blessing of same-gender couples, though the policy is in discussion and not yet approved. Other clergy in Bishop Martin's Diocese support LGBT inclusion in the Church.

In February 2022, by a two-thirds majority, the diocesan synod of the Anglican Diocese of the Southeast approved sending the national synod a motion to modify the canon of marriage to allow for same-sex marriage. The General Synod referred the proposal to allow same-sex marriage for further study which prompted bishop Martín to pledge continued support for the full inclusion of LGBTQ Christians in the sacramental life of the Church. In 2022, at the Fifteenth Lambeth Conference Bishop Martín was the only Mexican who signed a pro-LGBTQ statement affirming the holiness of love of all committed same-sex couples.

Doctrine and practice

The center of the Anglican Church of Mexico's teaching is the life and resurrection of Jesus Christ. The basic teachings of the church, or catechism, includes:
Jesus Christ is fully human and fully God. He died and was resurrected from the dead.
Jesus provides the way of eternal life for those who believe.
The Old and New Testaments of the Bible were written by people "under the inspiration of the Holy Spirit".  The Apocrypha are additional books that are used in Christian worship, but not for the formation of doctrine.
The two great and necessary sacraments are Holy Baptism and Holy Eucharist
Other sacramental rites are confirmation, ordination, marriage, reconciliation of a penitent, and unction.
Belief in heaven and hell as states of being, and Jesus's return in glory.

The threefold sources of authority in Anglicanism are scripture, tradition, and reason. These three sources uphold and critique each other in a dynamic way. This balance of scripture, tradition and reason is traced to the work of Richard Hooker, a sixteenth-century apologist. In Hooker's model, scripture is the primary means of arriving at doctrine and things stated plainly in scripture are accepted as true. Issues that are ambiguous are determined by tradition, which is checked by reason.

Ecumenical relations 
Unlike many other Anglican churches, the Anglican Church of Mexico is not a member of the ecumenical World Council of Churches. The denomination maintains ecumenical dialogue with the Roman Catholic Church and Orthodox churches.

The Anglican Church of Mexico considers itself to be a part of the Global Center seeking to reconcile the divide between conservative and liberal provinces in the Anglican Communion while respecting diversity of opinion and practice.

References

Bishops 
Melchor Saucedo
José G. Saucedo
Julio César Martín-Trejo
Apostolic Succession

The episcopate of the Anglican Church of Mexico historically derives its Apostolic Succession from the Episcopal Church (USA), however, a Church of England bishop and the bishop of the Spanish Reformed Episcopal Church, both having been consecrated by the Primate of the Church of England, George Carey, Archbishop of Canterbury, and by Old Catholic and Irish bishops among them John Coote Duggan, 
bishop of Tuam, Killala and Achonry, of the Church of Ireland, and Joachim Vobbe, bishop of Bonn, of the Old Catholic Church, Union of Utrecht, participated in 2019 as co-consecrators for the 22nd of the bishops (Rt. Rev. Julio C. Martín) of the Anglican Church of Mexico effectively introducing the Dutch Old Catholic, the Irish and the English lines of Apostolic Succession into the Mexican Anglican episcopate.

Further reading
Anglicanism, Neill, Stephen. Harmondsworth, 1965.

External links
Anglican Church of Mexico Official Website
 The Anglican Diocese of Southeastern México
Anglican history in Mexico from Project Canterbury
St. Mark´s Parish, Anglican Church in Guadalajara, Mex.
Christ Church Parish, Mexico City, Mex.
Catedral de San Miguel y Todos los Angeles, Cuernavaca, Morelos
José G. Saucedo
Julio César Martín-Trejo

 
Churches in Mexico
Religious organizations established in 1860
Anglican denominations in North America
Anglican organizations established in the 19th century
Protestant denominations established in the 19th century
Mexico
1860 establishments in Mexico
Cuernavaca
Morelos